Evergestis marionalis is a species of moth in the family Crambidae described by Patrice J.A. Leraut in 2003. It is found in south-eastern France, Spain, Malta and North Africa (Algeria, Morocco and Tunisia).

Adults are somewhat variable, especially in the dark bands on the forewings. Adults are on wing in February and March, and again from July to October in at least two generations per year.

The larvae probably feed on Brassicaceae species.

References

Moths described in 2003
Evergestis
Moths of Europe
Moths of Africa